Frank Nolan (10 June 1915 – 31 May 1989) was an Australian rules footballer who played with Hawthorn in the Victorian Football League (VFL).

Family
The son of Hugh Nolan (1884–1965), and Elizabeth Mary Nolan (1887–1961), née Brown, Frank Nolan was born at St Kilda, Victoria on 10 June 1915.

He married Edna Mary Clifton (1916–1993) in 1940.

Football

Caulfield (FDL)
Nolan kicked 116 goals for the Caulfield Football Club in the Federal District League in 1933.

Hawthorn (VFL)
Cleared from Caulfield in May 1934, Nolan played two games for the Hawthorn First XVIII in the early part of the 1934 VFL season, scoring a goal in each of his games against Collingwood and Essendon but mostly played for the Second XVIII in his time at Hawthorn in 1934.

Caulfield (FDL)
He returned to Caulfield in 1935.

Oakleigh (VFA)
In 1937 he trialled with both Oakleigh and Hawthorn. He was cleared from Hawthorn to Oakleigh in April 1937, and became a key goal scorer for them over the next four seasons.

Military service
He later served in the Australian Army in Papua New Guinea during World War II.

Notes

References
 
 World War Two Nominal Roll: Private Frank Nolan (VX41702), Department of Veterans' Affairs.
 B883, VX41702: World War Two Service Record: Private Frank Nolan (VX41702), National Archives of Australia.
 World War Two Nominal Roll: Gunner Frank Nolan (VX132061), Department of Veterans' Affairs.
 B883, VX132061: World War Two Service Record: Gunner Frank Nolan (VX132061), National Archives of Australia.

External links 
 
 
 Frank Nolan, at The VFA Project
 Frank Nolan, at ''Boyles Football Photos

1915 births
1989 deaths
Australian rules footballers from Melbourne
Hawthorn Football Club players
Oakleigh Football Club players
Australian Army personnel of World War II
Australian Army soldiers
People from St Kilda, Victoria
Military personnel from Melbourne